A police captain is a police rank in some countries, such as the United States and France and in the Philippines.

By country

France 

France uses the rank of capitaine for management duties in both uniformed and plain-clothed policing. The rank comes senior to lieutenant and junior to commandant. This rank was previously known as inspecteur principal for plain-clothed officers, and officier de la paix principal for officers in uniform.

United Kingdom 
In the United Kingdom, the approximate equivalent rank of a police captain is that of chief inspector.

United States 

In most US police departments, the rank of captain is immediately above that of lieutenant. A police captain is often the officer in charge of a precinct.

In some smaller police departments, a person holding the rank of police captain may be in charge of a division (patrol division, detective division, etc.) within that department. In larger police departments, a police captain may command only one section of a precinct which is commanded by either a police major, police inspector, or the next highest rank. A police captain is considered upper-level management in most large urban police departments.

New York City
In the New York City Police Department, the rank of captain is immediately below deputy inspector. Captains are usually veterans with extensive experience.

Philippines  

In the Philippines, the rank of a Police Captain is equivalent to a Senior Inspector based on the original Philippine National Police rank under the Republic Act 6975. It is currently in effect since 2019.

Notable police captains
Derwin Brown
George Gastlin
John H. McCullagh
Maharram Seyidov
Jacob B. Warlow

See also
Captain

References

Police ranks
Captains